Baileya acadiana is a moth of the family Nolidae. It is found in Alabama, Arkansas, Louisiana, Mississippi and Texas.

Adults are on wing in three generations in Louisiana, with the first brood peaking in the beginning of April and subsequent broods peaking at sixty-day intervals.

External links
Two New Species of Baileya from the Southeastern United States

Nolidae
Moths described in 2004